Palazzo del Podestà is Italian for "Palace of the Chief Magistrate" of a town.

Palazzo del Podesta may refer to:

 Palazzo del Podestà, Bologna, a civic building in Bologna
 , a building in Florence; see List of palaces in Italy
 , a civic building in Forlì
 Palazzo del Podestà, Mantua, a palazzo and site of municipal offices
  near Piazza dei Signori, Verona
 , near Piazza del Duomo, San Gimignano
 Palazzo Comunale, San Gimignano, a palazzo that was the podestà of San Gimignano during the 14th century
 , a World Heritage site in Genoa
 The Bargello, formerly Palazzo del Podestà, now an art museum in Florence

See also 
 Palazzo Comunale (disambiguation)
 Palazzo Pretorio (disambiguation)
 Palazzo della Ragione (disambiguation)
 Arengario, Italian government buildings of different historic periods
 Arengo, the assembly of San Marino from the fifth century